George Russell Anderson (24 October 1904 – December 1974) was a Scottish professional footballer who played in the Football League for a number of clubs as a forward.

Career statistics

Sources
Canary Citizens by Mike Davage, John Eastwood, Kevin Platt, published by Jarrold Publishing, (2001), 
99 Years & Counting – Stats & Stories – Huddersfield Town History

References

1904 births
1974 deaths
People from Saltcoats
Scottish footballers
Association football forwards
Brentford F.C. players
Chelsea F.C. players
Norwich City F.C. players
Gillingham F.C. players
Bury F.C. players
Huddersfield Town A.F.C. players
Mansfield Town F.C. players
English Football League players
Footballers from North Ayrshire
Scottish Football League players
Dalry Thistle F.C. players
Airdrieonians F.C. (1878) players
Carlisle United F.C. players
Cowdenbeath F.C. players
Yeovil Town F.C. players
Southern Football League players
Midland Football League players
Ayr United F.C. players
Saltcoats Victoria F.C. players
Newark F.C. players